George Bradford Brainerd (November 27, 1845 – April 13, 1887) was an American civil engineer, amateur photographer, and an amateur natural historian.

Biography
Brainerd was born on November 27, 1845, in Haddam Neck, Connecticut. He attended Rensselaer Polytechnic Institute in Troy, New York, from which he graduated in 1865. While at R.P.I., he, along with seven other men, founded the Theta Xi fraternity.  As a civil engineer, Brainerd worked for the then-City of Brooklyn in the position of Deputy Water Purveyor — a position he held for 17 years (1869 to 1886). During this time, Brainerd published the 48-page book The Water Works of Brooklyn (1873).

George Brainerd died on April 13, 1887, at 12:00 pm in Brooklyn. He is buried in an unknown plot in Old Rock Landing Cemetery in Haddam, Connecticut. He suffered from an acute throat infection in the mid-1880s and had a brain tumor, which led to a stroke and paralysis. Smoking and frequent exposure to toxic photography chemicals likely contributed to the development of his tumor.

Works
Brainerd's work as an amateur photographer began when he was just 13 years old. He began by making his own cameras and developing ambrotypes from them. While working as a civil engineer, Brainerd photographed public work projects, as well as street scenes in Brooklyn. He also took extensive photographs of areas in New York State, including on Long Island and along the Hudson River. His subjects included houses, churches, mills, railroad stations, gate houses, reservoirs, harbors, beaches, and ponds, among others. Over the years, Brainerd continued to design his own cameras and photographic techniques. Through his inventions he was able to photograph the human vocal organs, thus contributing to the perfection of this type of medical photography. As an amateur natural historian, he amassed a large collection of bird skins, shells, and minerals, as well as maintained his own herbarium, and collected moss and lichens.

Brainerd, a lifelong Brooklynite, produced a total of 2,500 photographs before his death at age 41 in 1887. The majority of his surviving images are of Brooklyn, a vast documentation of the urban landscape—dams and mills, bridges and train depots, engine houses and pumping stations—but also, especially after 1880, images of city dwellers and street scenes.

Independently wealthy and the Deputy Water Purveyor for the City of Brooklyn, Brainerd was an advanced amateur photographer adept at exploring new techniques. His legacy remains in the Brooklyn Museum, with about 1,900 of his glass-plate negatives making up a large portion of the museum's huge collection of Brooklyn- and New York-themed glass-plate negatives.

Gallery

References

1845 births
1887 deaths
American civil engineers
Rensselaer Polytechnic Institute alumni
Photographers from New York City
People from Haddam, Connecticut
Engineers from Connecticut
Engineers from New York (state)